Pseudarcopagia is a genus of bivalves that exist in Australia and New Zealand.

Description

These are small surf clams.

Taxonomy
Pseudarcopagia contains the following species:
 Pseudarcopagia victoriae
 Pseudarcopagia ponsonbyi
 Pseudarcopagia botanica
 Pseudarcopagia disculus
 Pseudarcopagia decora

References

Tellinidae
Bivalve genera